α-Ketovaleric acid is a keto acid that is found in human blood.  Unlike related keto acids, it is not an intermediate or metabolite associated with amino acids and its origin is unknown.

See also
 α-Ketoisovaleric acid
 3-Oxopentanoic acid (β-ketovaleric acid)
 Levulinic acid (γ-ketovaleric acid)

References

Alpha-keto acids